The Estadio José María Minella is a stadium in the city of Mar del Plata, Argentina. It is owned and administrated by the Municipality of General Pueyrredón. Inaugurated for the 1978 FIFA World Cup hosted by Argentina, the stadium is currently used by local clubs Alvarado and Aldosivi to play their home matches.

The stadium is named after renowned football player and manager José María Minella, a native of Mar del Plata and regarded as one of the most notable footballers of that city.

History
Argentina was chosen as the host 1978 World Cup of the nation by FIFA in London, England on 6 July 1966, and Mar del Plata, as one of the most touristic cities in the country, was selected as a venue. The stadium has the distinction of being the southernmost stadium to host a World Cup match. The organizing committee, under supervision of the military dictatorship that ruled Argentina since 1976, decided to build a new stadium on the same spot as 40 years earlier it had been the Mar del Plata hippodrome. The construction began in 1975 and the stadium was opened on May 21, 1978 with a friendly match between a team formed by players from Mar del Plata and another one with players from Tandil.

The sports journalist Mario Trucco proposed the name to honour José María Minella, a renowned former midfielder from Mar del Plata, who played during the 1930s and 1940s for River Plate and the Argentina national football team, and later manager of River Plate team from 1945 to 1959 in what became one of the team's most successful eras.

During the 1978 World Cup Mar del Plata hosted six Fifa World Cup matches, three Group 1 and three Group 3 matches.

As the city of Mar del Plata is a very important tourist destination and the biggest seaside beach resort in Argentina, since its construction this stadium has been the main host of the many annual Summer Tournaments. Prior to the construction of Minella stadium, the main venue of the city was General San Martín Stadium, with capacity for 15,000 spectators. That venue used to host matches of local teams San Lorenzo, Kimberley and Aldosivi.

On February 24, 1993, the stadium played host to the second, and final, Intercontinental Cup for Nations (known as the Artemio Franchi Trophy) match between the then-defending South American football champions, Argentina, and reigning European champions, Denmark. The match ended 1–1 after extra time, but Argentina went on to win 5–4 on penalties.

From March 12 to March 26, 1995 Mar del Plata hosted the 12th Pan American Games, and the José María Minella was venue for the opening and closing ceremonies, and the football tournament.

Since 2015, club Aldosivi plays in Primera División and uses this stadium for its home matches, along with Alvarado, currently playing in Torneo Federal A.

Facilities 
The José María Minella offers parking lots for 250 cars, a 590 m2 lounge and 245 m2 VIP area, conference room and two 550 m2 gyms. It is part of the "Teodoro Bronzini" Municipal Sports Park, a 35 hectares area with several sport venues, including the Polideportivo Islas Malvinas, the Julio Polet Municipal Velodrome, the Pan American Field Hockey Stadium, the "Alberto Zorrilla" Natatorium, the "Justo Roman" Athletic stadium and the Patinódromo Municipal.

Sporting Events 
The stadium was built for the 1978 FIFA World Cup and during June 1978 it hosted six matches, three Group 1 matches and three Group 3 matches.

1978 FIFA World Cup

2001 FIFA U-20 World Cup 

The stadium hosted all the matches of Group F

Argentina national football team matches

Rugby union 
The stadium has hosted several rugby union matches, such as follows:

The stadium was also the main venue of the 2001 Rugby World Cup Sevens

Other sporting events hosted 

 Torneos de Verano (1979–2019)
 1995 Pan American Games
 1999 South American U-20 Championship
 2006 South American Women's Football Championship

Music concerts 
Some of the artists that have played at this stadium are Almendra (1980), Charly García (1984), Queen (1981), Rod Stewart (1989), Soda Stereo (1992), Luis Miguel (1994), La Renga (2006), Duran Duran (2007), Callejeros (2010), Joaquín Sabina (2010) and Ricardo Arjona (2015).

References

External links

 

1978 FIFA World Cup stadiums
j
Rugby union stadiums in Argentina
Estadio Jose Maria Minella
Sports venues completed in 1978
Estadio Jose Maria Minella
Sports venues in Buenos Aires Province
Pan American Games opening ceremony stadiums
Estadio Jose Maria Minella
Venues of the 1995 Pan American Games
Sport in Mar del Plata
1978 establishments in Argentina
World Rugby Sevens Series venues